Bodziony may refer to:

 Mount Bodziony, Antarctic mountain
 Krzysztof Bodziony (born 1985), Polish footballer